Jeremy D. Howard (born October 22), is an American actor, producer and writer, best known for his work as a cast member on The CW sketch comedy series MADtv in 2016 and for his popular character Sunbrella.

References

External links

Male actors from Nashville, Tennessee
American male television actors
American male comedians
21st-century American male actors
American sketch comedians
Living people
21st-century American comedians
Year of birth missing (living people)